Bladenboro Township, population 6,009, is one of fifteen townships in Bladen County, North Carolina. The Town of Bladenboro is within Bladenboro Township. Butters, an unincorporated community is also within Bladenboro Township.

Geography
Bladenboro Township is drained by tributaries of Big Swamp and include Bryant Swamp and Horsepen Branch.  All of these streams are part of the larger Lumber River drainage.

References

Townships in Bladen County, North Carolina
Townships in North Carolina